Wayne Joseph Babych (born June 6, 1958) is a Canadian former professional ice hockey right winger who played in the National Hockey League (NHL) for the St. Louis Blues, Pittsburgh Penguins, Quebec Nordiques, and Hartford Whalers. He is the older brother of former NHL player Dave Babych. He is of Ukrainian ancestry.

Babych played his junior career with the Edmonton Oil Kings and Portland Winter Hawks of the Western Canada Hockey League before being drafted 3rd overall by St. Louis in the 1978 NHL Amateur Draft. A skilled winger, he netted 20 or more goals four times in seven full NHL seasons. In 1980-81, Babych become the first 50-goal scorer in Blues franchise history. His 54 goals stood as the Blues single season record until Brett Hull's 72 goal campaign in 1989-90. Babych, Hull and Brendan Shanahan are the only players in Blues history to record 50 goal seasons.

He is now living in the Winnipeg, Manitoba area.

Career statistics

Awards
 WCHL First All-Star Team – 1977 & 1978

See also
 List of family relations in the NHL

References

External links
 

1958 births
Living people
Canadian ice hockey right wingers
Canadian people of Ukrainian descent
Edmonton Oil Kings (WCHL) players
Hartford Whalers players
National Hockey League first-round draft picks
Pittsburgh Penguins players
Portland Winterhawks players
Quebec Nordiques players
Ice hockey people from Edmonton
St. Louis Blues draft picks
St. Louis Blues players